Gloria Gary Lawlah (born March 12, 1939) is an American politician who served as the Secretary of the Maryland Department of Aging under Governor Martin O'Malley from 2007 to 2015. She previously served in the Maryland Senate from 1991 to 2007 and in the Maryland House of Delegates from 1987 to 1991.

Early life and education
Lawlah was born in Newberry, South Carolina on March 12, 1939. She grew up with Newberry alongside her sister, Gene. She attended Hampton University in Hampton, Virginia, where she earned a bachelor's degree in social studies. While at Hampton, she met her future husband, Jack, who eventually settled in LeDroit Park, a neighborhood in Washington, D.C.. In 1972, she moved to Hillcrest Heights, Maryland.

Career
Lawlah first got involved with politics after realizing that her home in Hillcrest Heights was represented by a Republican in the United States House of Representatives. Afterwards, she began working with elected officials and the local NAACP to integrate schools in Prince George's County, Maryland. She then got involved with the Prince George's County Women's Democratic Club, where she was able to meet U.S. Representative Gladys Spellman, Maryland governor Marvin Mandel, and then-state Senator Steny Hoyer.

Maryland House of Delegates
Lawlah was sworn into the Maryland House of Delegates on January 14, 1987.

Committee assignments
 Member, Constitutional and Administrative Law Committee, 1987–1991
 Member, Joint Committee on Federal Relations, 1987–1991

Maryland Senate
In 1990, Lawlah defeated incumbent state Senator Frank Komenda in the Democratic primary election, backed by abortion-rights advocates who sought to create a filibuster-proof majority in the Maryland Senate. Despite her, and other, victories in the general elections that year, the sought-after supermajority was never achieved. She was sworn in on January 9, 1991.

Lawlah considered running in the 1992 United States House of Representatives election in Maryland's 4th congressional district. In October 1991, she endorsed Prince George's County State's Attorney Alexander Williams Jr. for the seat.

Lawlah did not seek re-election in 2006, seeking to retire at the end of the year.

Committee assignments
 Senate Chair, Joint Committee on the Management of Public Funds, 2001–2007
 Member, Budget and Taxation Committee, 1995–2007 (capital budget subcommittee, 1999–2007; chair, health & human services subcommittee, 2003–2007, member, 2001–2007; chair, health, education & human resources subcommittee, 1997–1999; chair, public safety, transportation & environment subcommittee, 2000)
 Member, Economic and Environmental Affairs Committee, 1991–1994
 Member, Joint Committee on Investigation, 1991–2007
 Member, Joint Legislative Work Group on Community College Financing, 1994–1995
 Member, Special Joint Task Force on Transportation, 1995
 Member, Executive Nominations Committee, 1995–2000
 Member, Joint Committee on the Selection of the State Treasurer, 1996, 2003
 Member, Spending Affordability Committee, 1997–2000
 Member, Joint Audit Committee, 1998–2007
 Member, Joint Committee on Health Care Delivery and Financing, 1998–2007
 Member, Senate Committee on Redistricting, 2001–2002
 Member, Legislative Policy Committee, 2001–2003
 Member, Special Commission on Legislative Prayer, 2003
 Member, Joint Committee on the State's Emergency Medical Response System, 2003–2005
 Senate Co-chair, Joint Committee on Protocol, 2003–2007

Other memberships
 Chair, Prince George's County Delegation, 2004–2007 (vice-chair, 2001–2003)
 Member, Legislative Black Caucus of Maryland, 1999–2007 (chair, international affairs committee, 2001–2007; member, state budget committee, 2000, judicial nominating committee, 2000–2007, redistricting committee, 2000–2007, historically black colleges & universities committee, 2001–2007)
 Member, Women Legislators of Maryland, 1991–2007 (member at large, executive board, 2001–2002; 2nd vice-president, 2002–2003; president, 2003–2004)
 Member, National Conference of State Legislatures (economic development, trade & cultural affairs committee)

Maryland Secretary of Aging
On February 7, 2007, Governor Martin O'Malley appointed Lawlah to serve as the Secretary of the Maryland Department of Aging. Her nomination was unanimously approved by the Maryland Senate on February 23, 2007.

Post-secretary career
Lawlah remained active in politics after 2015, organizing the 1,000 Maryland Women political action committee.

Lawlah endorsed former Secretary of State Hillary Clinton for president on November 17, 2015. In April 2016, Lawlah endorsed U.S. Representative Chris Van Hollen in the 2016 United States Senate election in Maryland. In July 2019, she endorsed former Vice President Joe Biden for president. In the 2020 presidential election, Lawlah voted as an elector in Maryland's 4th congressional district. In March 2021, she endorsed Maryland comptroller Peter Franchot for Governor of Maryland.

Personal life
Lawlah is married to her husband, Jack, and has three children and six grandchildren. Together, they live in Hillcrest Heights, Maryland.

Political positions

Abortion
Lawlah identifies as "pro-choice". In 1990, she challenged and defeated anti-abortion state Senator Frank Komenda in the Democratic primary elections after he voted for legislation that would have eliminated about 90 percent of abortions in Maryland. In 1991, Lawlah voted in favor of legislation that would provide access to abortion in Maryland while requiring physicians to inform minors' parents when their children seek an abortion. The bill passed and was signed into law by Governor William Donald Schaefer on February 18, 1991.

Gambling
Despite objections she made during hearings, Lawlah supported legislation backed by Governor Bob Ehrlich in 2004 to allow Prince George's County racetracks to have slot machines. In July 2011, Lawlah resigned from the Video Lottery Facility Location Commission after attending a single meeting, saying that she was "thrilled" to be named but had not anticipated the "tough" schedule.

Social issues
In October 1992, Lawlah criticized the Prince George's County Judicial Nominating Commission for rejecting attorney Elvira M. White, a Black woman, for judgeship based on charges of White being a "closet racist". In August 1994, she came to White's support after a Circuit Court judge ruled that she failed to adequately represent a woman charged with conspiring to murder her parents.

Term limits
In 2000, Lawlah refused to endorse a referendum to abolish term limits for the county executive and county council of Prince George's County. In November of that year, voters rejected a referendum by a 2-to-1 margin.

Electoral history

References

1939 births
People from Newberry, South Carolina
21st-century American women politicians
21st-century American politicians
Living people
Democratic Party members of the Maryland House of Delegates
Women state legislators in Maryland
Hampton University alumni
2020 United States presidential electors